North Lakhimpur is a city and a municipal board in Lakhimpur district in the Indian state of Assam, about  northeast of Guwahati. It is the district headquarters of Lakhimpur district.

North Lakhimpur is also the name of the subdivision of Lakhimpur district where North Lakhimpur town is located.

Geography
It is situated at 27° 13' 60 N and 94° 7' 0 E. Significant parts of Lakhimpur include Phulbari, Laluk, Dhakuakhana, Narayanpur, Nowboicha, Town Bantow, Chetiagaon, Khelmati, NT Road, DK Road, KB Road, CD Road, Nakari, Bormuria, Joyhing and Moidomia, Angarkhuwa, Dhakuwakhania Goan, Hansuwa Tiniali etc..

Demographics
As of the 2001 India census, North Lakhimpur had a population of 54,262. Based on population, it is classified as a class-II city (between 50,000 and 99,999 inhabitants). According to the 2011 census, it has a population of 105,376.

Males constituted 53% of the population and females 47%. North Lakhimpur has an average literacy rate of 89%, higher than the national average of 65%: male literacy is 90%, and female literacy is 87%. In North Lakhimpur, 13% of the population is under 6 years of age.

Language

Assamese is the most spoken language at 40,972 speakers, followed by Bengali at 9,942, Mishing is spoken by 1,195 people and Hindi at 6,383.

Administration
The MLA of Lakhimpur constituency is Shri Manab Deka since 2021.

Transportation
North Lakhimpur is considered to be the 'Gateway to Arunachal'. It is well connected by air, road and rail.

Road
North Lakhimpur is well connected by road. The NH-15 passes through the city. Both AC and non-AC buses are available from Assam State Transport Corporation, and private bus stands to Guwahati and other long-distance routes.

Rail
The North Lakhimpur railway station is located at Nakari. It lies on the Rangiya–Murkongselek section of Rangiya railway division.
Intercity Express (Murkongselek-Kamakhya) to and from Guwahati is operating between North Lakhimpur and Guwahati via Rangia, Rangapara, Biswanath Chariali, etc. Another Intercity Express (Naharlagun-Guwahati) also operates between Harmuti and Guwahati via the same route. The Harmuti railway station is situated at Harmuti, approximately 30 km. from the North Lakhimpur.

Air
Flights are operated to Kolkata and Guwahati by Alliance Air, four days in a week.

Water
One can travel to Dibrugarh, Sivasagar and Jorhat (via Majuli) by crossing the Brahmaputra River by ferry from North Lakhimpur. The Bogibeel Bridge creates a direct route for a quick commute to Dibrugarh.

Climate

Education

Colleges
 Lakhimpur Medical College and Hospital
 North Lakhimpur commerce College
 Lakhimpur Girls' College
 Lakhimpur Telahi Kamalabaria College
 North Lakhimpur College

Schools
 Ghilamara Town HS School
 Lakhimpur Kendriya Mahavidyalaya
 St. Mary's High School

Media
Lakhimpur has an All India Radio relay station known as Akashvani Lakhimpur. It broadcasts on FM frequencies.

Print media 
Assamese language newspapers published from North Lakhimpur include the Asomiya Pratidin and Amar Asom.

Notable people
 Padmanath Gohain Baruah
 Iswar Prasanna Hazarika
 Uddhab Bharali, innovator
 Labanya Dutta Goswami, (1952-2009)
 Raaj J Konwar, Bollywood singer

References

 
Cities and towns in Lakhimpur district